Gerhard Schmidt-Gaden (born 19 June 1937) is a German conductor, especially a choral conductor, and an academic teacher. He founded and conducted the Tölzer Knabenchor.

Life 
Born in Karlovy Vary, Czechoslovakia, Schmidt-Gaden studied conducting with Kurt Eichhorn in Munich, choral conducting with Kurt Thomas in Leipzig, and singing with Helge Rosvaenge, Otto Iro and Mario Tonelli.

In 1956 he founded the Tölzer Knabenchor, a boys' choir which achieved international fame within a few years. He conducted the choir until 2016. He was influenced by Carl Orff, Hans Werner Henze, Herbert von Karajan, August Everding and Claudio Abbado. His musical development was particularly influenced by his longstanding collaboration with Nikolaus Harnoncourt, with the Tölzer Knabenchor performing in Harnoncourt's first recordings of Bach's works in historically informed performance. In 1978, Schmidt-Gaden founded the "Florilegium Musicum", a chamber orchestra for early music with original instruments.

From 1980 to 1988 he was professor of choral conducting at the Mozarteum in Salzburg. From 1984 to 1989 he also worked as choir director at La Scala in Milan.

The writer , who sang in the Tölzer Knabenchor from 1988 to 1994, reported in 2017 retrospectively about mental abuse by Schmidt-Gaden up to the singing of a mocking song on the then overweight Kloeble during a bus ride of the choir. Another choirboy confirmed the atmosphere of fear, humiliation and emotional violence up to a slap in the face. Schmidt-Gaden did not comment on the accusations.

Schmidt-Gadens recordings with the Tölzer Knabenchor include Bach's Christmas Oratorio with the Collegium Aureum, Kleine Geistliche Konzerte by Heinrich Schütz, and sacred choral music by Orlande de Lassus. A reviewer of Gramophone noted about their 1971 recording of the Christmas Oratorio that it "bursts forth with spirited expectation as the Nativity is vigorously explored".

He took farewell from the Tölzer Knabenchor with a concert of four motets by Bach at the Stadtpfarrkirche in Bad Tölz in January 2016, opening the year of celebrating the choir's 60th anniversary.

Awards 
 1983: Verdienstorden der Bundesrepublik Deutschland 
 1984: Bayerischer Poetentaler
 1991: 
 1994: Bayerischer Verdienstorden
 2003: Echo Music Prize Classic for the recording of Bußpsalmen by Orlande de Lassus
 2009: Bayerische Verfassungsmedaille in silver

Publications 
 Gerhard Schmidt-Gaden: Wege der Stimmbildung. , Munich 1992,

References

External links 
 
 
 Gerhard Schmidt-Gaden (Choir Conductor) Bach Cantatas Website

German choral conductors
Recipients of the Cross of the Order of Merit of the Federal Republic of Germany
Echo (music award) winners
1937 births
Living people
Musicians from Karlovy Vary